960 Fifth Avenue, also known as 3 East 77th Street, is a luxury apartment building on Fifth Avenue on the northeast corner of East 77th Street in Manhattan, New York.

History

960 Fifth Avenue was built on the former site of the William A. Clark House.  When Senator Clark died in 1925, his widow and daughter, Huguette Clark, moved to 907 Fifth Avenue and sold the mansion, which cost $7 million, to Anthony Campagna for $3 million in 1927.  Campagana had the mansion torn down just 19 years after it was built in 1911.

The new building was designed by Warren & Wetmore, who were responsible for Grand Central Terminal and the supervisory architects was Rosario Candela of Cross & Cross. Candela was "a 1920's architect known for grand flowing apartment layouts" who had a habit of cloistering bedroom wings away from the grand entertaining rooms.  Dorothy Draper, the prominent interior decorator, was used as a consultant on the project.  Campagna used Douglas L. Elliman & Co. as his broker for the sale of the coop apartments.

The building was started in 1927 and completed in 1928. Apartments average 14 to 17 rooms, with 8 maids' rooms, and is one of the few in New York with its own in-house restaurant.  The original apartments were priced from $130,000 to $325,000 and more than 75 percent of the apartments were sold before the frame of the building was enclosed.  The largest initial stockholder in the building was Dr. Preston Pope Satterwhite who reportedly paid $450,000 for his 20-room apartment, which was considered the most expensive cooperative sale ever paid at the time.

Reputation
According to Hall Willkie, president of Brown Harris Stevens, the building, along with 820 Fifth Avenue and 834 Fifth Avenue, is one of the "three top buildings, in terms of size, quality of apartments, and price" on Fifth Avenue.  

Dan Dorfman of The New York Sun referred to the building as "the pinnacle of New York luxury living" and stated that "some real estate experts consider it Manhattan's premier residential building."

Notable sales
In 2009, Murray H. Goodman listed his apartment at $32.5 million, but sold it to Benjamin Steinbruch two years later for $18.875 million.

In 2013, the 11 room apartment 10/11B, was listed for sale by Charles Lazarus, founder of Toys "R" Us, at $24.5 million after an initial listing of $29 million in 2011. It was eventually sold in 2014 to Carlos Rodriguez-Pastor, a Peruvian businessman who is the chairman of Interbank, for $21 million.  This was believed to be the same apartment once owned by Dr. Satterwhite.

In 2014, the 16-room PHB apartment of Edgar Bronfman, Sr., former chairman of the Seagram Company who lived there for 40 years until his death in 2013, was listed for sale at $65 million. it was bought by Nassef Sawiris, the chief executive of Orascom Construction Industries and richest man in Egypt, for a reported $70 million, the then most expensive co-op in New York. It was the second most expensive coop sale in Manhattan in 2014 following the $71.3 million sale of a corner duplex at 740 Park Avenue to Israel Englander.

In 2017, the apartment of art dealer Robert H. Ellsworth and his partner Masahiro Hashiguchi, which encompassed the entire third floor, was sold to Carlos Alejandro Pérez Dávila, a Colombian financier (cousin of Alejandro Santo Domingo) whose family once controlled SABMiller, for $55 million.  It was the most expensive coop sale in New York in 2017.  The apartment was first owned by James H. Snowden in 1928 and was a duplex along with the fourth floor.

Notable residents
Past and present notable residents of the building included or include:

 Edgar Bronfman, Sr.
 Sister Parish
 Robert H. Ellsworth and Masahiro Hashiguchi
 Claus von Bülow
 Murray H. Goodman
 Louis Untermeyer
 C. Douglas Dillon
 Nassef Sawiris and Sherine Magar
 Charles Lazarus and Joan Regenbogen
 John Sullivan Jr. and Nonie Sullivan
 David Mackie
 Sharmin and Bijan Mossavar-Rahmani
 Emilia and José "Pepe" Fanjul
 Winthrop W. Aldrich
 Mathew and Ann Wolf
 Benjamin Steinbruch
 Gail Auchincloss Gilbert (wife of S. Parker Gilbert) and her son, S. Parker Gilbert, Jr.
 James Krugman and Connie Simmons
 James Coleman Jr.
 James and Marie Marlas
 Henri and Marsha Wedell
 William and Sherry Cherry
 Peter and Laura Grauer
 Mary Lawrence Porter
 Joseph and Mary Jane Platt
 James and Stephania McClennen
 Carlos Rodriguez-Pastor
 Andrew Atterbury and Gwyn Prentice
 Coleman and Susan Burke
 Elizabeth Ballantine and Paul Leavitt
 Gustavo and Patty Cisneros

See also
 William A. Clark House

References

Residential buildings completed in 1928
Residential skyscrapers in Manhattan
Condominiums and housing cooperatives in Manhattan
960
Art Deco architecture in Manhattan
Upper East Side
Rosario Candela buildings